Madha Taluka is one of the 11 tehsils of Solapur District in the Indian state of Maharashtra. 

As of 2001, the tehsil population was 2,92,611.

See also
 Sahyadri Tiger Reserve

References

External links
The official website of Solapur district

Talukas in Solapur district